Willis Merton "Wee Willie" Smith  (July 2, 1910 – September 4, 1996) was an American football back who played one season with the New York Giants of the National Football League.

High school
Smith first enrolled at Lexington Senior High School in Lexington, Nebraska, transferred to Sheridan High School in Sheridan, Wyoming, and then to Boise High School in Boise, Idaho, where he graduated.

College
Smith played college football at the University of Idaho in Moscow under head coach Leo Calland. A three-year star at quarterback  his nickname was "Little Giant" while  Smith also played baseball, graduated in 1934 with a degree in education, and was a member of Phi Gamma Delta fraternity.

Professional football

Smith played in nine games in the National Football League, starting one, for the New York Giants  In the 17–7 win over Pittsburgh on October 21, Smith scored the final touchdown on a three-yard run to seal the win. The following week, he scored a late touchdown on a 24-yard run in the 17–0 win over Philadelphia.

The Giants, coached by Steve Owen, finished 8–5 in the regular season and won the Eastern Division. They met George Halas' undefeated Chicago Bears for a third time that season in the NFL championship game. The Bears had won the two regular season games in November and led 13–3 after three quarters on a frigid December 9, but the Giants scored four touchdowns in the fourth quarter to secure a 30–13 upset at the Polo Grounds for the league title,  in what was later known as the "Sneakers" game. Due to his small stature, Smith wore number zero and generated a considerable amount of interest in the press.

In 1936, Smith played for the independent Los Angeles Bulldogs, who played all their games at home at Gilmore Stadium.

After football
By 1937, he was out of football and back in northern Idaho, working as an area supervisor for the Works Progress Administration (WPA) 

He served as a training officer in the U.S. Army in World War II, and coached the football team at Fort Warren in Cheyenne, Wyoming.

Personal life
Smith was blind in one eye; he died at age 86 in Albuquerque, New Mexico, and is buried at the Santa Fe National Cemetery (section 4, site 8B).

References

External links

University of Idaho Athletics Hall of Fame – Willis Smith
Just Sports Stats

1910 births
1996 deaths
Players of American football from Nebraska
American football running backs
American football defensive backs
American football quarterbacks
Idaho Vandals football players
Idaho Vandals baseball players
New York Giants players
Los Angeles Bulldogs players
Sportspeople with a vision impairment
American blind people
United States Army personnel of World War II
People from Lexington, Nebraska
United States Army personnel of the Korean War
United States Army personnel of the Vietnam War
United States Army colonels